Govindrao or Govind Rao is a Marathi given name that may refer to
Govindrao Adik (1939–2015), Indian politician 
Govindrao Patwardhan  (1925–1996), Indian harmonium and organ player 
Govindrao Tembe (1881–1955), Indian harmonium player, stage actor and music composer
Govind Rao Gaekwad (died 1800), Indian Maharaja
Baburao Govindrao Shirke (1918–2010), Indian businessman 
Pratap Govindrao Pawar, Indian industrialist
Prataprao Govindrao Chikhalikar (born 1960), Indian politician

See also
Govind

Indian masculine given names